Bruno Pedron S.D.B. (3 June 1944 – 17 June 2022) was an Italian Roman Catholic prelate.

Pedron was born in Torreglia, Italy and was ordained to the priesthood in 1974. He served as coadjutor bishop and bishop of the Roman Catholic Diocese of Jardim, Brazil, from 1999 to 2007 and as bishop of the Roman Catholic Diocese of Ji-Paraná, Brazil, from 2007 until his retirement in 2019.

References

1944 births
2022 deaths
Italian Roman Catholic bishops
Bishops appointed by Pope John Paul II
Bishops appointed by Pope Benedict XVI
Roman Catholic bishops of Jardim
Roman Catholic bishops of Ji-Paraná
People from the Province of Padua
Salesian bishops